The McCoys were a rock group formed in Union City, Indiana, United States, in 1962. They are best known for their 1965 hit single "Hang On Sloopy". Their name was changed from Rick and the Raiders to The McCoys, taken from the B-side of The Ventures' hit record "Walk, Don't Run" titled "The McCoy".

Career
The original members were all from Union City; however, the Zehringer boys were initially from Fort Recovery, Ohio. The band members were guitarist and lead singer Richard Zehringer (later known as Rick Derringer), his brother Randy (later known as Randy Z) on drums, and bassist Dennis Kelly. This first line-up was known as The Rick Z Combo, and later known as Rick and the Raiders. When Kelly left for college, the Zehringers were joined by bassist Randy Jo Hobbs, saxophonist Sean Michaels, and keyboardist Ronnie Brandon. This was the line-up that took the name of "The McCoys". Brandon left the group in 1965 and was replaced by Bobby Peterson on keyboards.

Their best-known hit is "Hang On Sloopy", which was #1 in the United States in the Billboard Hot 100 chart in October 1965 and is the official rock song of the state of Ohio. It also is the unofficial fight song of the Ohio State University Buckeyes and is played at many Ohio State athletic events by the OSU bands. Sales of the single in the US alone were over one million copies. Other hits include a top 10 cover of "Fever" (Billboard #7) and a top 40 cover of Ritchie Valens's "Come On, Let's Go" (Billboard #21).

A cover of "Sorrow", the B-side of their version of "Fever", was a hit in the United Kingdom for The Merseys and later covered by David Bowie. Its opening line, "with your long blonde hair and eyes of blue" was quoted by George Harrison in the fadeout of "It's All Too Much", featured on the 1969 soundtrack of Yellow Submarine.

"The McCoys" performed as part of Murray the K's Christmas show on December 18, 1965 at the Brooklyn Fox Theater. Also performing on the program were Peter & Gordon, Wilson Pickett, The Fortunes, The Moody Blues, The Toys, Lenny Welch, Cannibal and the Headhunters, The Vibrations, The Spinners, The O'Jays, Bloodless Revolutionaries, Patti Michaels, Bobby Diamond, and Diane Langan.

The McCoys were being labeled as a bubblegum pop act, much to the disdain of the band. In 1967, after the death of Bert Berns, The McCoys broke free from Bang Records in hopes of recording more serious music. They ended up signing a deal with Mercury Records and recorded their last two records, Infinite McCoys (1968), and Human Ball (1969) for the label. The albums were The McCoys' attempt at making psychedelic music that would appeal to the mature listeners of that time. Both were commercial failures and did not chart anywhere.

The two Zehringer brothers (then known as Rick Derringer and Randy Z) and Hobbs became Johnny Winter's band for the albums Johnny Winter And and Live Johnny Winter And in 1970 and 1971 respectively. At first, the band was supposed to be called Johnny Winter & The McCoys, but was changed due to management warning Winter about their bubblegum past, and how it could hurt his reputation as a serious musician. As backing musicians, both Derringer and Hobbs contributed to Winter's later releases Still Alive and Well (1973), Saints & Sinners (1974), and John Dawson Winter III (1974). Derringer and Hobbs later played with Edgar Winter as well as appeared on Together: Edgar Winter and Johnny Winter Live (1976). Hobbs later toured with Johnny Winter, but without Derringer, on Winter's Captured Live! (1976). Derringer also played with Steely Dan and Cyndi Lauper and formed bands such as DNA, with drummer Carmine Appice.

Hobbs died of drug-related heart failure on 5 August 1993 (Derringer's birthday) at the age of 45. Peterson died in Gainesville, Florida on 21 July 1993 at the age of 47.

Discography

Albums

Singles

See also
1965 in music
List of Billboard Hot 100 number-one singles of 1965

Notes

References

External links
 Classic Bands: The McCoys

Rock music groups from Indiana
Musical groups established in 1962
Bang Records artists
Mercury Records artists
People from Union City, Indiana
People from Fort Recovery, Ohio
1962 establishments in Indiana